Iván Casquero Cosío (born 14 July 1979) is a Spanish former footballer who played as a left back.

Playing career
Born in Gijón, Asturias, Casquero played youth football at Real Oviedo. On 26 May 1996, while still a junior, he made his first and only appearance in La Liga, coming on as a late substitute for Thomas Christiansen in a 3–1 away loss against CP Mérida.

In the 2000–01 and 2001–02 seasons, Casquero played a combined 26 matches in Segunda División matches for SD Eibar and CD Numancia. He all but competed in Segunda División B until his retirement at the age of 32, representing mainly Cultural y Deportiva Leonesa.

Coaching career
Casquero returned to Oviedo after retiring, and worked at the club as youth physio and assistant coach to their reserves.

References

External links

1979 births
Living people
Footballers from Gijón
Spanish footballers
Association football defenders
La Liga players
Segunda División players
Segunda División B players
Tercera División players
Real Oviedo Vetusta players
Real Oviedo players
SD Eibar footballers
CD Numancia players
Cultural Leonesa footballers
Universidad de Las Palmas CF footballers
Caudal Deportivo footballers